The 1973 Cincinnati Reds season consisted of the Reds winning the National League West with a Major League-best record of 99–63, 3½ games ahead of the Los Angeles Dodgers, before losing the NLCS to the New York Mets in five games. The Reds were managed by Sparky Anderson, and played their home games at Riverfront Stadium.

The Reds were coming off a devastating loss in seven games to the underdog Oakland Athletics in the 1972 World Series. The offseason did not start well for the Reds. In the winter, a growth was removed from the lung of Cincinnati's star catcher, Johnny Bench. While Bench played the entire 1973 season, his power numbers dropped from 40 home runs in 1972 to 25 in '73. He never again reached the 40 homer mark, something he accomplished in two of the three seasons prior to the surgery.

Coming into the season, the defending NL Champion Reds were still favored to win the strong NL West against the likes of the Houston Astros, the Los Angeles Dodgers, and the San Francisco Giants. The Reds' lineup returned virtually intact, with the exception of third base where the Reds tried to make a third baseman out of rookie Dan Driessen, a solid hitter (.301 average) who had played mostly first base in the minor leagues. With Tony Pérez fully entrenched at first base, the Reds wanted to get Driessen's bat in the lineup and his playing time was at the expense of the anemic hitting Denis Menke (.191), although the Reds were sacrificing defense with Driessen at the hot corner. The other change was at shortstop, where Dave Concepción emerged from a 1972 timeshare with Darrel Chaney to full-time starter, finally realizing his potential in his fourth year in the majors. Concepción was outstanding both at bat and in the field and was named to the NL All-Star team. But two days before the mid-summer classic on July 22, in a game against the Montreal Expos, Concepción broke his ankle sliding into third base after moving from first base on a Menke base hit, and missed the second half of the season. Concepción was batting .287, with eight home runs, 46 RBI, 39 runs scored and 22 stolen bases, all career highs despite missing almost half the season.

The Reds had other hurdles to overcome. Cincinnati's pitching ace, Gary Nolan (15–5, 1.99 ERA in '72), suffered from a sore arm that limited him to two starts and 10 innings pitched before it was discovered he had a torn ligament in his right elbow. The injury would force Nolan to also miss the entire 1974 season. There was also an issue with centerfielder Bobby Tolan. He slumped badly to .206, became a malcontent, and had several squabbles with members of Reds management, who were still unhappy with his 1971 basketball injury that cost him that season as well as Tolan's error in Game 7 of the 1972 World Series against Oakland that was arguably the key play in that game. Tolan went AWOL for two days in August 1973, and broke team rules by growing a beard. On September 27, the team suspended Tolan for the remainder of the season including the NLCS.

The Reds started well, and were 25–16 about a quarter of the way through the season and led the second-place Dodgers by a 1½ games on May 23. But with Tolan, Menke and Bench mired in slumps and some of the Reds starting pitchers struggling, the Reds began to flounder. Reds general manager Bob Howsam determined the Reds offense would eventually come around, but the pitching staff needed help. With Nolan sidelined indefinitely and starters Jim McGlothlin (ineffectiveness) and Roger Nelson (injuries) struggling, Howsam traded for San Diego Padres left-hander Fred Norman on June 12. At the time of the trade, the 5-foot-8 lefty was 1–7 for the last-place Padres, but Norman would go 12–6 in 24 starts for the Reds to provide a major boost.

The Reds were still in a slump when they met the Dodgers for a July 1, doubleheader in Cincinnati. The Reds were 39–37 and trailed the Dodgers (51–27) by 11 games. Just as they had done 12 years earlier, the Reds swept the Dodgers in a doubleheader to jumpstart their pennant hopes. In Game 1, Cincinnati's third-string catcher, Hal King, belted a game-winning, three-run home run with two outs in the bottom of the ninth inning off Don Sutton to give the Reds a 4–3 victory. In Game 2, Tony Pérez singled in the game-winner off knuckleball specialist Charlie Hough in the bottom of the 10th as the Reds won 3–2. The doubleheader sweep was part of a stretch where Cincinnati won 10 of 11 games and by July 10, had cut the Dodgers' lead to 4½ games.

Both teams stayed close throughout the season, but on Aug. 29, the Reds beat Pittsburgh, 5–3, to begin a seven-game winning streak. After losing two to the Braves, the Reds began another seven-game winning streak to gain some space between the Dodgers. Los Angeles came into Cincinnati for a two-game series, Sept. 11–12, trailing the Reds by 3 games with 18 left on the schedule. A two-run home run by rookie Ken Griffey was the big hit in the Reds' 6–3 victory on Sept. 11, and the Reds completed the sweep the next day as Jack Billingham hurled a complete-game and, the typically poor hitter (.065 average), also belted a bases-clearing double off LA starter Claude Osteen in a 7–3 victory. The Dodgers left Cincinnati trailing by five games. On Sept. 24, the Reds beat San Diego, 2–1, to clinch their second-straight division title and third in four years. It sent the Reds to the 1973 NLCS against the New York Mets.

The Reds offense was led by Pete Rose (team-record 230 hits, 115 runs scored, an NL best .338 batting average), Joe Morgan (116 runs, 26 home runs, 82 RBI, 67 stolen bases, .290 avg.) and Perez (.314, 27, 101). Rose was voted the National League MVP, while Morgan finished fourth and Perez seventh in a vote by the Baseball Writers' Association of America.

Jack Billingham emerged as the staff ace, leading the National League in both innings pitched (293.1) and shutouts (7) to go with 19 victories, while young lefty Don Gullett won 11 of his last 12 decisions to finish 18–8.

Future stars Griffey and George Foster also played well in short stays with the Reds. Griffey batted .384 in 86 at bats in his major league debut, while Foster hit .282 and smacked four home runs in just 39 at bats. Journeyman third-string catcher Hal King also emerged as an unsung hero. King hit three pinch hit home runs, all of which either tied or won games late including a three-run home run off Los Angeles Dodger starter Don Sutton on July 1 to win a game for the Reds.

Offseason 
 November 27, 1972: Nardi Contreras was drafted from the Reds by the New York Mets in the 1972 minor league draft.
 November 30, 1972: Hal McRae and Wayne Simpson were traded by the Reds to the Kansas City Royals for Roger Nelson and Richie Scheinblum.
 March 27, 1973: Mel Behney was traded by the Reds to the Boston Red Sox for Andy Kosco and Phil Gagliano.

Season standings

Record vs. opponents

Notable transactions 
 June 12, 1973: Gene Locklear and Mike Johnson were traded by the Reds to the San Diego Padres for Fred Norman.

Roster

Player stats

Batting

Starters by position 
Note: Pos = Position; G = Games played; AB = At bats; H = Hits; Avg. = Batting average; HR = Home runs; RBI = Runs batted in

Other batters 
Note: G = Games played; AB = At bats; H = Hits; Avg. = Batting average; HR = Home runs; RBI = Runs batted in

Pitching

Starting pitchers 
Note: G = Games pitched; IP = Innings pitched; W = Wins; L = Losses; ERA = Earned run average; SO = Strikeouts

Other pitchers 
Note: G = Games pitched; IP = Innings pitched; W = Wins; L = Losses; ERA = Earned run average; SO = Strikeouts

Relief pitchers 
Note: G = Games pitched; W = Wins; L = Losses; SV = Saves; ERA = Earned run average; SO = Strikeouts

1973 National League Championship Series 

The Reds lost the National League Championship Series to the Mets 3 games to 2 despite heroics by Rose and Bench in Game 1 and Rose again in Game 4. Rose's eighth-inning home run against Tom Seaver tied the score at 1–1 and Bench won it in the 9th with another solo home run. Rose also hit a game-winning home run in the 12th-inning to tie the series at 2–2. During Game Three of the series, Rose got into a fight with the popular Mets shortstop Bud Harrelson while trying to break up a double play; the fight resulted in a bench-clearing brawl. The umpires threatened the Mets with forfeiting the game, after fans responded by hurling garbage from the stands at Rose, causing the Reds team to leave the field until order was restored.

Game 1 

October 6: Riverfront Stadium, Cincinnati

Game 2 

October 7: Riverfront Stadium, Cincinnati

Game 3 

October 8: Shea Stadium, New York City, New York

Game 4 

October 9: Shea Stadium, New York City, New York

Game 5 
October 10: Shea Stadium, New York City, New York

Awards and honors 
 Pete Rose – National League Most Valuable Player
 Pete Rose – National League Batting Champion

Farm system

Notes

References 
 1973 Cincinnati Reds Statistics and Roster at Baseball Reference

Cincinnati Reds seasons
Cincinnati Reds season
National League West champion seasons
Cincinnati